The 1995 Comcast U.S. Indoor was a men's tennis tournament played on indoor carpet courts that was part of the Championship Series of the 1995 ATP Tour. It was the 28th edition of the tournament and was played at the CoreStates Spectrum in Philadelphia, Pennsylvania in the United States from February 20 to February 27, 1995. Unseeded Thomas Enqvist won the singles title.

Finals

Singles

 Thomas Enqvist defeated  Michael Chang 0–6, 6–4, 6–0
 It was Enqvist's 2nd singles title of the year and the 4th of his career.

Doubles

 Jim Grabb /  Jonathan Stark defeated  Jacco Eltingh /  Paul Haarhuis 7–6, 6–7, 6–3
 It was Grabb's 1st title of the year and the 18th of his career. It was Stark's 2nd title of the year and the 14th of his career.

References

External links
 ITF tournament edition details

Comcast U.S. Indoor
U.S. Pro Indoor
Comcast U.S.
Comcast U.S.
Comcast U.S.